Kenneth S. Kosik, M.D. is an American neurologist, author, researcher and professor in neuroscience at the University of California, Santa Barbara. Recent contributions includes a significant discovery in understanding the way human embryonic stem cells function. He has contributed to novel thinking about how to reduce risk for getting Alzheimer's disease and reduce the impact of this illness on our communities.  He was the founder and executive director of Cognitive Fitness & Innovative Therapies, followed by the Cottage Center for Brain Fitness. Kosik provided much of the original data on the largest family in the world with a genetic form of Alzheimer's disease located in Antioquia, Colombia.

Awards
 Whitaker Health Sciences Award, Massachusetts Institute of Technology
 Metropolitan Life Foundation Medical Award
 Derek Denny-Brown Neurological Scholar Award, the American Neurological Association (1990)
 Zenith Award from the Alzheimer's Association
 Ranwell Caputo Medal, the Argentine Society of Neurochemistry
 NASA Group Achievement Award to the Neurolab Science Team
 Potamkin Prize (2021)

Publications
Outsmarting Alzheimer's: What You Can Do to Reduce Your Risk; Kenneth S. Kosik with Alisa Bowman; Publish Date: December 29, 2015 
 The Alzheimer's Solution: How Today's Care Is Failing Millions- and How We Can Do Better; Kenneth S. Kosik, Ellen Clegg; Publish Date:   August 2009 .
 When Someone You Love Has Alzheimer's: The Caregiver's Journey; Earl A. Grollman, Kenneth S. Kosik; Publish Date: November 1997 .
 Selected publications of K.S. Kosik, M.D.

References

External links
 Kosik Lab Website at UCSB

Year of birth missing (living people)
Living people
American neurologists
Drexel University alumni
Harvard Medical School faculty
University of California, Santa Barbara faculty